Dmitry Ivanovich the Grandson (1483–1509) was Grand Prince of Moscow between 1498 and 1502.

Dmitry's parents were Ivan the Young, crown heir of Moscow, and Elena of Moldavia, daughter of Stephen III of Moldavia. After his father's death in 1490 he became heir presumptive of Muscovy.  In February 1498, Ivan III had his grandson, Dmitry, crowned grand prince of Vladimir, Moscow and all Russia.

Even after receiving the title and official position Dmitry Ivanovich did not play any political role in the Grand Duchy. On the other hand, his uncle Vasili received, from Ivan III of Russia, control of Novgorod and Pskov in 1499.

During the next three years the Moscovy court became a place of conspiracy between supporters of Dmitry, represented by his mother Elena, and supporters of Ivan's second-born son Vasili, represented by his mother and Ivan III's second wife, Sophia Paleologue.

On 11 April 1502 Ivan III sent Dmitry and his mother Elena to prison. Three days later Ivan made Vasili, autocrat of all Russia. In 1509, Dmitri died in prison.

References

Sources

Resource
Российский гуманитарный энциклопедический словарь

See also
Rulers of Russia family tree

1483 births
1509 deaths
15th-century Grand Princes of Moscow
16th-century Grand Princes of Moscow
Grand Princes of Moscow
Russian people who died in prison custody
Prisoners who died in Russian detention
Rurik dynasty
Heirs apparent who never acceded